Caldwell & Drake was a construction firm based in Indiana, USA.  It included George W. Caldwell and Lester Drake.

A number of their works are listed on the U.S. National Register of Historic Places.

Works include:
New Hope Bridge, Columbus Township, Bartholomew County, Indiana
Hotel Sansone, 312 Park Central East Springfield, MO (Caldwell and Drake), NRHP-listed
Jefferson County Armory, 525 W. Muhammad Ali Blvd. Louisville, KY (Caldwell & Drake), NRHP-listed
Monroe County Courthouse, Courthouse Sq. Bloomington, IN (Caldwell, George & Drake, Lester), NRHP-listed
Ottawa County Courthouse, W. 4th and Madison Sts. Port Clinton, OH (Caldwell & Drake), NRHP-listed
Somerset County Courthouse, E. Union St. and N. Center Ave. Somerset, PA (Caldwell & Drake), NRHP-listed
Starke County Courthouse, Courthouse Sq. Knox, IN (Caldwell & Drake), NRHP-listed
Stewart Hall, West Virginia University campus Morgantown, WV (Caldwell & Drake), NRHP-listed
 West Baden Springs Hotel,  West Baden Springs, IN
Wood County Courthouse, Court Sq. at 3rd and Market St. Parkersburg, WV (Caldwell & Drake), NRHP-listed

References

Construction and civil engineering companies of the United States